The vernacular architecture of the Carpathians draws on environmental and cultural sources to create unique designs.

Vernacular architecture refers to non-professional, folk architecture, including that of the peasants. In the Carpathian Mountains and the surrounding foothills, wood and clay are the primary traditional building materials.

Effect of culture and religion

Eastern Christianity

Because most Ukrainian, Rusyn, and Romanian people are Eastern Christians, their building techniques have traditionally incorporated religious considerations into their buildings that are distinct from their Western Christian and Jewish neighbours.

Firstly, all churches are divided into three parts (the narthex, the nave, and the sanctuary) and include an iconostasis (a wall of icons). The outer shape is often cruciform (cross shaped), but will always include a central dome and often several other domes. Parishioners face east during worship and there are no pews.

The main door and windows of the home face south (as in passive solar design), and icons and other religious paraphernalia are displayed in a special icon corner, usually on the east wall.

Judaism

East-Central European synagogues are noted for their unique all-wooden design.

Materials and techniques

Details vary from locale to locale but the majority of homes in this area have traditionally been a single-storey rectangular plan; one or two rooms; a central chimney; a gable, hipped-gable or hipped roof; and plastered and limewashed exteriors.

Materials used were those that could be procured locally, including wood (usually oak), mud, straw, fieldstone, lime, and animal dung. Roofs in densely wooded and hilly areas are typically clad in wooden shakes or shingles, while flatter and more open areas have traditionally used rye straw.

In the late 19th century two types of construction predominated, horizontal log construction, and frame and fill construction. Log walls were common in areas where wood was available. In places with very poor timber or with an extreme timber shortage post and sill or wattle and daub techniques could also be used.

For horizontal log construction, logs needed to be notched in order to hold together. The simple saddle notch is the easiest and therefore common. Dovetailing is used by people with more experience in woodworking.

Many peoples in this area plaster their log homes inside and out to keep out moisture, improve insulation, to hide imperfections in construction, and for general aesthetic value. Traditional plaster is made of clay, water, dung, and straw or chaff. Several coats may be applied to create a smooth finish, and then coated with lime and water to produce a pleasing white colour and protect the clay from the rain.

Thatched roofs are traditional, but have been declining in popularity for over a century because they may pose a fire hazard. Dirt floors are common, and are made hard by washing with a dung mixture, although wooden floors are preferred. 

The centre of the home is dominated by a traditional clay oven (Ukrainian: pich or pietz)

World Heritage
 Wooden Churches of Ukraine
 Wooden Churches of Maramureş
 Carpathian Wooden Churches
 Wooden Churches of Southern Lesser Poland
 Zakopane Style of Architecture

See also
 Articular church
 Burdei

References
 Lehr, John C., "Ukrainians in Western Canada" in To Build in a New Land (Baltimore and London: The Johns Hopkins University Press, 1992) pp 309–330.

Carpathian
Architecture in Poland
Architecture in Romania
Architecture in Ukraine
History of Galicia (Eastern Europe)
Carpathians